SS William Wirt was a Liberty ship built in the United States during World War II. She was named after William Wirt, an American author and statesman who is credited with turning the position of United States Attorney General into one of influence. He was the longest serving Attorney General in US history. He was also the Anti-Masonic Party nominee for president in the 1832 election.

Construction
William Wirt was laid down on 13 May 1942, under a Maritime Commission (MARCOM) contract, MCE hull 50, by the Bethlehem-Fairfield Shipyard, Baltimore, Maryland; sponsored by Mrs. Wharton H. Hoy, the niece J.A. Bouslog, the manager of the Middle Atlantic District for MARCOM, and was launched on 4 July 1942.

History
She was allocated to Alcoa Steamship Co., Inc., on 24 July 1942. On 16 December 1947, she was laid up in the National Defense Reserve Fleet, Wilmington, North Carolina. She was sold for scrapping on 2 November 1965, to Union Minerals & Alloys Corp., for $46,287. She was withdrawn from the fleet on 24 November 1965.

References

Bibliography

 
 
 
 

 

Liberty ships
Ships built in Baltimore
1942 ships
Wilmington Reserve Fleet